Ball Don't Lie is a 2008 film directed by Brin Hill. It is an adaptation of the novel of the same name, written by Matt de la Peña.  It stars AND1 Mixtape team member Grayson Boucher, a.k.a. The Professor. The film premiered at the 2008 Tribeca Film Festival.

Plot
Ball Don't Lie plays out over one day in the life of Sticky (Boucher), a skinny high school sophomore basketball prodigy from Venice, California. Burdened with emotional scars from a traumatic childhood, a callous foster care system, and obsessive-compulsive personality disorder, Sticky manages to transcend his limitations whenever he has a ball in his hands.

Cast
 Maxim Knight - Sticky, Age 7 
 Grayson Boucher - Sticky
 Kim Hidalgo - Annie
 Emilie de Ravin - Baby
 Rosanna Arquette - Francine
 Ludacris - Julius
 Cress Williams - Dante
 Nick Cannon - Mico
 Dania Ramirez - Carmen
 Melissa Leo - Georgia
 Harold Perrineau - Jimmy
 Mykelti Williamson - Dallas
 Robert Wisdom - Perkins
 Steve Harris - Rob
 Allen Maldonado - Sin
 John Bryant Davila - Venice Hardcore Teen
 Mathew St. Patrick - Louis Accord
 Michael Shamus Wiles - Coach Reynolds
 Kirby Bliss Blanton - Jamie Smith

References

External links
 
 

2008 films
American basketball films
2000s teen drama films
Films set in Los Angeles
American teen drama films
Teen sports films
2008 drama films
2000s English-language films
2000s American films